Matino is a rural locality (a village) in Yenangskoye Rural Settlement, Kichmengsko-Gorodetsky District, Vologda Oblast, Russia. The population was 18 as of 2002.

Geography 
Matino is located 67 km southeast of Kichmengsky Gorodok (the district's administrative centre) by road. Ogryzkovo is the nearest rural locality.

References 

Rural localities in Kichmengsko-Gorodetsky District